Typestry is a 3D software program released in the 1990s by Pixar for Apple Macintosh and Windows-based PC computer systems ($299 US). Unlike general purpose modellers and renderers, Typestry concentrated on rendering and animating text entered by the user in multiple fonts. The fonts were extruded into three dimensions, with various bevel styles and textures applied during rendering. Typestry creates 3D text with Type 1 and TrueType fonts and can do many different effects:
 4 different bevel styles
 add Looks
 9 front and 9 back lights (total 18 lights, turn off/on by change intensity, can shift relative positions, select lighting style for each light)
 one ambient front and one ambient back light
 scale, move, and rotate objects
 animate text
 animate lights
 Export TIFF, EPS, PICT, RIB file format

Version 2.0 
 Load EPS file from Adobe Illustrator 3.0+
 Particle system
 Put text on rubber sheets for flag effect
 Use tubes for out line text
 Fog effect
 Require Adobe Type Manager 2.0+ for Type 1 fonts
 RenderMan Expert mode for edit Looks
 Require Windows 3.11+ with  Win 32s or Windows NT, 8MB RAM, 7MB hard drive space for Wintel.

Version 2.1 
 Support TrueType GX fonts (Mac System 7 only)
 Import/export 3D Portable Digital Documents
 Native for PowerMac

All Mac version can't use outline font if not have screen font; no problem for Type 1 fonts because have screen font for each style (italic, bold, heavy, etc.) but TrueType fonts only have one screen font for main style. Windows version can use any Windows font.

Typestry was one of Pixar's several application software packages released in open markets (besides RenderMan, MacRenderMan, NetRenderMan, IceMan, Glimpse, Showplace, One Twenty Eight (textures)). It was discontinued when Pixar chose to concentrate on film production instead of application development.

Glimpse 
Glimpse is "a sophisticated Renderman shader made easy to use as a glimpse look" for try help Renderman become standard for 3D shading like Postscript for DTP during middle of 1990s. Pixar also "sell Glimpse for 99$US (1993) to use in Typestry and ShowPlace". Later, ShowPlace 2.0 include Glimpse, a tool for edit Looks, "textures and surface effects" for render objects with RenderMan, with GUI. Glimpse have sliders for change material attributes like color, reflection coefficients, surface roughness and gives users real time preview of changes, not need wait for new RenderMan render. But Glimpse not let users edit shader source code. Looks have two parts, Look Masters (default setting for Look but can't can't edit them) and Looks Instances, version of Look with created by changing settings in Glimpse.

Alternative tool from Valis Group have name Shader Toolkit for edit RenderMan Looks but more complex and not interactive like Glimpse.

References

3D graphics software
Pixar